Herbjørg Wassmo (born  6 December 1942) is a Norwegian author.

She was born in Vesterålen and worked as a teacher in northern Norway until beginning her career as an author. Her first published work was a collection of poems, "Vingeslag" ("Beating of Wings"). Her major breakthrough was her first novel, "Huset med den blinde glassveranda" ("The House with the Blind Glass Porch") in 1981.

Her 1989 novel, Dinas bok (Dina's Book), was made into a film titled I Am Dina in 2002, starring Maria Bonnevie and Gérard Depardieu.

Bibliography
Vingeslag (poetry, 1976)
Flotid (poetry, 1977)
Huset med den blinde glassveranda (novel - Volume I of the Tora trilogy, 1981 - published in English as The House with the Blind Glass Windows)
Det stumme rommet (novel - Volume II of the Tora trilogy, 1983)
Juni-vinter (play, 1983)
Veien å gå (documentary novel, 1984)
Mellomlanding (play, 1985)
Hudløs himmel (novel - Volume III of the Tora trilogy, 1986)
Dinas bok (novel - Volume I of the Dina trilogy, 1989 - published in English translation as Dina's Book)
Lite grønt bilde i stor blå ramme (poetry, 1991)
Lykkens sønn (novel - Volume II of the Dina trilogy, 1992 - published in English translation as Dina's Son)
Reiser - fire fortellinger (1995)
Hemmelig torsdag i treet (children's book, 1996)
Karnas arv (novel - - Volume III of the Dina trilogy, 1997)
Det sjuende møte (novel, 2000)
Flukten fra Frank (novel, 2003)
Et glass melk takk (novel, 2006)
Hundre år (novel, 2009)
Disse øyeblikk (novel, 2013)
Den som ser (novel, 2017)
Mitt menneske (novel, 2021)

Prizes
Kritikerprisen 1981, for Huset med den blinde glassveranda
Bokhandlerprisen 1983, for Det stumme rommet
Nordland fylkes kulturpris 1986
The Nordic Council's Literature Prize (Nordisk Råds litteraturpris) 1987, for Hudløs himmel
Gyldendal's Endowment 1991
Amalie Skram-prisen 1997
Prix Jean Monnét 1998 (France)

References and notes

1942 births
Living people
Norwegian Critics Prize for Literature winners
20th-century Norwegian novelists
21st-century Norwegian novelists
Norwegian women novelists
20th-century Norwegian poets
Nordic Council Literature Prize winners
Norwegian women poets
21st-century Norwegian women writers
20th-century Norwegian women writers